Tímea Babos and Kristina Mladenovic were the defending champions, but chose not to participate this year.

Hsieh Su-wei and Barbora Strýcová won the title, defeating Anna-Lena Grönefeld and Demi Schuurs in the final, 6–4, 6–7(4–7), [10–8].

Seeds

Draw

Draw

References

External links
 Main Draw

Birmingham Classicandnbsp;- Doubles
Doubles